The First Death is a book by Dimitris Lyacos.  It is part of the Poena Damni trilogy. The book tells the story of a marooned man on a desert island in a sequence of fourteen poem sections, recounting his relentless struggle for survival as well as his physical and mental disintegration. The work alludes simultaneously to a modern Philoctetes, an inverted version of Crusoe as well as the myth of the dismemberment of Dionysus. The dense and nightmarish imagery of the poem, replete with sensations of hallucination, delirium, synesthesia, and putrefaction has drawn comparisons to  Lautreamont, Trakl and Beckett. Despite being first in the publication history of the Poena Damni trilogy, The First Death is chronologically last in the narrative sequence.

Title
The title of the book refers to the contradistinction between first and second death in the Apocalypse of St. John the Divine, the first death referring to the natural end of life (death of the body) as opposed to the second death (annihilation, death of the soul). Insofar as the first death is not of a spiritual kind it is not considered as "real death", that is to say, annihilation. In a spiritual sense, the protagonist of the book subsists in a "hellish" kind of existence, presumably awaiting the occurrence of future redemption or definitive extinction. The title also refers to the occurrence of the first death in the context of the biblical history of the human race, namely the murder of Abel by his brother Cain.

Synopsis
The First Death recounts the ordeal of a 40-year-old male named adam stranded on a desert-like island. The book starts with a description of his mutilated body which grinds against the rocks. The poem expands on the theme of his continuing degradation, physical and mental, as even the mechanisms of memory are dislocated. Yet, the bond between person and body ensures life still persists, and, "at that point without substance/ where the world collides and takes off", the mechanical instincts of the cosmos rumble into action and sling this irreducible substance again into space - prompting, perhaps, a future regeneration.

Themes

The First Death, recounts the result of its protagonist's voyaging towards annihilation. His body and mind are on the verge of dissolution while fighting for continuance and survival. Portrayed as a victim of nature and presumably expelled by society, he is represented both as a castaway and an abortion, dying before he has ever achieved birth. The work describes his purgatorial-like torture, mapping a desert and rocky island as the locus of his suffering. His exclusion and solitude allude to Greek Tragedy, most importantly Philoctetes, while images of mutilation and dismemberment relate to ancient Greek sacrifices and rituals. The myth of the dismemberment of Dionysus by the Titans is also hinted at as the text resorts to the concept of sparagmos (from σπαράσσω sparasso, "tear, rend, pull to pieces"), an act of rending, tearing apart, or mangling, Other oblique classical references are equally embedded in the text, such as the presence of Orpheus, also suggested by images of dismemberment. In its role as the epilogue of the Poena Damni trilogy the poem also witnesses the aftermath of the impending violence of the first volume, Z213: Exit.

Style

The original Greek employs an unconventional modern idiom, accommodating a variety of ancient Greek words and integrating them into the flow of the text. Contrary to the previous book of the trilogy, With the People from the Bridge, which makes use of predominantly bare, simple sentences in a theatrical context, The First Death is written in a dense, highly tropical style. Each poem section unravels a multi-layered concatenation of images in order to illustrate the unremitting torment of the book's protagonist. Often, the weightiness of surreal abstraction lends a metaphysical atmosphere to the work, thus investing the ordeal undergone by the protagonist with a sublime-like quality as, he, in spite of the world, continues his struggle to the limits of his powers. Images of spoiled, rotten, maimed nature, artifacts, architecture and especially bodies are described in such rich detail they take on an eerie, atrocious, paradoxical glory. The book brings to bear aspects of the Homeric clarity of description which are in their turn coupled with fierce and expressionistic depictions of a nightmarish setting. In its aligning disparate literary traditions in order to intensely depict the clash of the human subject in the midst of a hostile world, The First Death, is considered as one of the most violent works of Greek literature in modern times.

Critical reception and publication history
Being the first to have been published among the three installments of the Poena Damni trilogy The First Death has received a number of reviews that span over two decades. Some critics underline the work's close connection with Ancient Greek Literature due to its hybrid linguistic character and its allusions to Tragedy" while others see a strong connection with current events. Critic Toti O'Brien notes: "As I read The First Death, I imagine the carpet of corpses lining the Mediterranean. Strata and strata of limbs—now bones—piled up during recent decades, all belonging to shiploads of migrants seeking escape through Europe. I can’t help connecting the poetry under my eyes with this precise scenery. The most powerful, the most disturbing imagery Lyacos paints makes sense in this context where it naturally embeds itself."

The book was originally published in Greek in 1996 and has been translated in English, German, Spanish and Italian. The first English edition appeared in 2000 and went out of print in 2005. A second revised English edition was launched as an e-book in the spring of 2017 and subsequently appeared in print in the autumn of the same year. The new edition contains extended Translator's Notes explaining the Ancient Greek references to the original Greek text.

Further reading
 A 6000 words essay by Robert Zaller, analyzing Lyacos's trilogy in the Journal of Poetics Research
 A special feature on Dimitris Lyacos's trilogy on the Bitter Oleander Magazine including extensive excerpts and an interview with the author
John Taylor interviews Dimitris Lyacos. Gulf Coast, Issue 30.1, Winter/Spring 2018, Houston USA, (pp. 277–286)
Overview of the Poena Damni trilogy in Cleaver Magazine

References

Postmodern novels
2000 novels
Classical mythology in popular culture
Greek novels